John Fortune (born John C. Wood; 30 June 1939 – 31 December 2013) was an English actor, writer and satirist, best known for his work with John Bird and Rory Bremner on the TV series Bremner, Bird and Fortune.

Early life 
Fortune was born John Wood in Bristol in 1939. He was educated at Bristol Cathedral School and King's College, Cambridge, where he was to meet and form a lasting friendship with John Bird. He was a member of the semi-secretive Cambridge Apostles society, a debating club largely reserved for the brightest students.

Career  
Fortune's early work included contributions to Peter Cook's Establishment Club team in 1962, and as a regular member of the cast of the BBC-TV satire show Not So Much a Programme, More a Way of Life, both alongside Eleanor Bron and John Bird. Fortune and Bird also worked together on the TV show A Series of Birds in 1967, and Fortune and Bron wrote and performed a series of sketches for TV in Where Was Spring? in 1969. In 1971, with John Wells, he published the comic novel A Melon for Ecstasy, about a man who consummates his love affair with a tree. He appeared with Peter Sellers in a Barclays Bank television commercial in 1980, shortly before Sellers' death.

Along with writing several series for the BBC, in 1982 Fortune appeared in an episode of the BBC sitcom Yes Minister, as an army officer who brings the minister's attention to British-made weapons getting into the hands of terrorists.  In 1999, he starred with Warren Mitchell and Ken Campbell in Art at Wyndham's Theatre in London's West End.  He also appeared in the films Take A Girl Like You (1970), in which he shared a TV debate with John Bird, Kenny Everett's horror spoof Bloodbath at the House of Death (1984), England, My England (1995), Maybe Baby (2000), and Saving Grace (2000), and had a guest part in the sitcom Joking Apart.

Fortune's other work with John Bird included their series of satirical sketches The Long Johns, in which one interviewed the other in the guise of a senior figure such as a politician, businessman or government consultant. The sketches earned several BAFTA award nominations, winning the Television Light Entertainment Performance award in 1997.  In one episode, they were two of the very first to predict the financial crisis of 2007–2010 during an episode of The South Bank Show broadcast on 14 October 2007.  In Fortune's latter years, he featured in the Radio 4 sitcom Ed Reardon's Week, playing the head of a literary agency and as theatrical agent Mel Simons in a 2008 episode of New Tricks.

Fortune died on 31 December 2013, aged 74. His agent Vivienne Clore said he died peacefully, with his wife Emma and dog Grizelle at his bedside.

Filmography

References

Further reading

External links 
 
 John Fortune at Vivienne Clore
 Bremner, Bird and Fortune, "Best Political Satire -Television, 2003" – Political Studies Association Awards 2003
 Bird and Fortune: A Life in Television BAFTA filmed event, March 2009
 Obituary in The Independent by Marcus Williamson

1939 births
2013 deaths
20th-century English novelists
Alumni of King's College, Cambridge
Best Entertainment Performance BAFTA Award (television) winners
English male comedians
English male film actors
English male radio actors
English male stage actors
English male television actors
English male writers
English satirists
People educated at Bristol Cathedral Choir School